is a dam in the Gifu Prefecture of Japan. Construction of the dam was completed by 1936. Its height is 40.8m and its maximum power output (from the power plant) is 41,700 kW.

See also
Dams in Japan
Energy in Japan

Dams in Gifu Prefecture
Dams completed in 1936